Mrugavani National Park is a national park located in Hyderabad, Telangana State, India. It is home to a 600 different types of plant life. The Park is home to around 350 spotted deer. The animals include: indian hare, forest cat, civet, Indian rat snake, Russell's viper, chital and the flower pecker.

History
It was declared as a National Park in 1994.

Flora and Fauna
Teak, Bamboo, Sandal, Picus, Palas, Rela.
The plant species include bryophytes, Pteridophytes, Herbs, Shrubs, Climbers and Trees. The vegetative cover presents a mosaic of woodland and grasslands. The plants of the park is of tropical waterless deciduous forest of degraded nature.
Cheetal, Sambar, Wild boar, Jungle Cat, Civet Cat, Mongoose Monitor Lizard, Python, Russell Viper, King Cobra.
The animals which are found here are Cheetal, Sambar, Wild boar, Jungle Cat, Civet Cat, Mongoose Monitor Lizard, Python, Russell Viper etc.
Apart from the varied flora and fauna the Mrugavani National Park boasts of more than 100 species of birds including warblers, peacocks, lapwings, and flower peckers.

The climate here is pleasant most of the time. There is a point in the park which is at a height for high point views and there is also a watch tower so as to watch animals closely.

There is also a library and Education center in regards to the Environment a museum and auditorium which exhibits wildlife. Visitors may also go for safari rides for those willing to get closer to the park's denizens, besides nature walks with guides.

The topography of Park supports woodlands, grasslands and rocky areas. Most of the vegetation can be classified as southern tropical dry deciduous forests. The Park does the significant job of conserving the near disappearing native flora of Hyderabad region.

Seasons
Winter – November to February

Summer – March to May

Monsoon – June to October

Average rainfall: 300 to 750 mm

Temperature:       Maximum 40 °C, Minimum 10 °C

Coordinates: 17° 21’ 27.79″ N, 78° 20’ 26.91″ E

Dominant flora and fauna
Teak, Bamboo, Sandal, Picus, Palas, Rela etc.

They are dry deciduous forest in the Southern tropical. The undulating topography shows the rocky side of the formation of the Deccan trap.
Mammals – Panther, Cheetal, Sambar, Wild boar, Jungle Cat, Civet Cat, Mongoose, Jackals, Porcupines, fox, Black naped Hare etc.

Reptiles – Snakes, Rat Snakes, Monitor Lizard, Russell Viper, Cobra etc.

Birds – Quails, Peacocks, Warblers, Partridges, Flower Peckers, Ducks, Curlews, Lapwings, Babbler, Koel etc.

Location
The Park is in near Chilkur Balaji Temple, about 20 km by road from MGBS

See also

 Mahavir Harina Vanasthali National Park
 Jawahar Deer Park

References

External links
Forest Department description (archived 8 January 2012)

National parks in Telangana
Tourist attractions in Hyderabad, India
1994 establishments in Andhra Pradesh
Protected areas established in 1994